Saadi Metro Station is a station of Mashhad Metro Line 2. The station opened on 20 March 2018. It is located on Saadi Sq.

References

Mashhad Metro stations
Railway stations opened in 2018
2018 establishments in Iran